Eragrostis aquatica is a species of grass (family Poaceae), native to west Honshu island, Japan. It grows on the edges of wet areas, and has also been recorded from South Korea.

References

aquatica
Endemic flora of Japan
Plants described in 1928